Oakmoor School is a coeducational secondary school located in Bordon, Hampshire, England.

It was founded in 1958 as Mill Chase County Secondary School. In 2007 the school gained specialist technology College status and was renamed Mill Chase Community Technology College. The school converted to academy status in November 2013 and was renamed Chase Hill Academy. Due to the expanding population of Bordon, in November 2019 the school relocated from Mill Chase Road to a new campus on Budds Lane and was renamed Oakmoor School.

Today, Oakmoor School is sponsored by the University of Chichester Multi Academy Trust, and offers GCSEs and BTECs as programmes of study for pupils.

References

External links
Oakmoor School official website

Secondary schools in Hampshire
Academies in Hampshire
Educational institutions established in 1958
1958 establishments in England